Cardinal voting refers to any electoral system which allows the voter to give each candidate an independent evaluation, typically a rating or grade. These are also referred to as "rated" (ratings ballot), "evaluative", "graded", or "absolute" voting systems. Cardinal methods (based on cardinal utility) and ordinal methods (based on ordinal utility) are two main categories of modern voting systems, along with plurality voting.

Variants 

There are several voting systems that allow independent ratings of each candidate. For example:

 Approval voting (AV) is the simplest possible method, which allows only the two grades (0, 1): "approved" or "unapproved".
 Evaluative voting (EV) or combined approval voting (CAV) uses 3 grades (−1, 0, +1): "against", "abstain", or "for".
 Score voting or range voting, in which ratings are numerical and the candidate with the highest average (or total) rating wins.
 Score voting uses a discrete integer scale, typically from 0 to 5 or 0 to 9.
 Range voting uses a continuous scale from 0 to 1.
 Highest median rules, which elect the candidate with the highest median grade. The various highest median rules differ in their tie-breaking methods. The majority judgment, in which the grades are associated to expressions (such as "Excellent", to "Poor"), is the most common example as it is the first such rule that has been studied, but other rules have since been proposed, e.g. the typical judgment or the usual judgment.
STAR voting, in which scores are from 0 to 5, and the most-preferred of the top-two highest-scoring candidates wins.
 Majority Approval Voting, a scored variant of Bucklin voting, typically using letter grades (such as "A" through "F").
 3-2-1 voting, in which voters rate each candidate "Good", "OK", or "Bad", and there are three automatic elimination steps to tally them: first step selects the three candidates with the most "Good" ratings, second the two with the least "Bad", and out of these the one preferred by the majority wins.

Additionally, several cardinal systems have variants for multi-winner elections, typically meant to produce proportional representation, such as:

 Proportional approval voting
 Sequential proportional approval voting
 Satisfaction approval voting
 Re-weighted range voting

Relationship to rankings 
Ratings ballots can be converted to ranked/preferential ballots. For example:

This requires the voting system to accommodate a voter's indifference between two candidates (as in Ranked Pairs or Schulze method).

The opposite is not true: Rankings cannot be converted to ratings, since ratings carry more information about strength of preference, which is destroyed when converting to rankings.

Analysis 
By avoiding ranking (and its implication of a monotonic approval reduction from most- to least-preferred candidate) cardinal voting methods may solve a very difficult problem:

A foundational result in social choice theory (the study of voting methods) is Arrow's impossibility theorem, which states that no method can comply with all of a simple set of desirable criteria. However, since one of these criteria (called "universality") implicitly requires that a method be ordinal, not cardinal, Arrow's theorem does not apply to cardinal methods.

Others, however, argue that ratings are fundamentally invalid, because meaningful interpersonal comparisons of utility are impossible. This was Arrow's original justification for only considering ranked systems, but later in life he stated that cardinal methods are "probably the best".  Cardinal methods inherently impose a tactical concern that any voter has regarding their second-favorite candidate, in the case that there are 3 or more candidates.  Score too high (or Approve) and the voter harms their favorite candidate's chance to win.  Score too low (or not Approve) and the voter helps the candidate they least desire to beat their second-favorite and perhaps win.

Psychological research has shown that cardinal ratings (on a numerical or Likert scale, for instance) are more valid and convey more information than ordinal rankings in measuring human opinion.

Cardinal methods can, but don't have to satisfy the Condorcet winner criterion.

Strategic voting 
The weighted mean utility theorem gives the optimal strategy for cardinal voting, which is to give maximum score for all options above expected value of the winning option and minimum score for all other options.

See also 

 Borda count

References 

 
Electoral systems
Psephology
Public choice theory
Social choice theory